Indooroopilly State High School (ISHS), colloquially known as "Indro", is a state high school situated in the south-western suburb of Indooroopilly in Brisbane, Queensland, Australia. The school was founded in 1954, and offers the International Baccalaureate Diploma Programme, along with a large curriculum catering to junior and senior students at the school.

Unlike most schools in Queensland and Australia, students at ISHS do not have to wear a school uniform. However, the school does have a sports uniform which students are required to wear during all interschool sports events.

Some of the Indooroopilly State High School Buildings are listed on the Queensland Heritage Register.

Facilities 
The school is made up of 23 different blocks. They are named in letter form in the order in which they were built. The letters range from A-X. Some of the facilities at the school include:

 Confucius Institute Classroom
 Dance and Art studios with a pottery kiln and film developing room
 Flight Simulator
 Student Centre
 Performance and Lecture Theatre
 Science and Cisco Networking laboratories
 Video conferencing centre
 A new school tuck shop (X Block) 
 A new Multi-Purpose Hall (MPH, W Block), the MPH houses one of the biggest LCD screens in a school setting, 3 sport courts, sport tracking cameras and much more. The hall has many uses but its main purpose is to allow the school to host all schools assemblies, which have previously not been possible due to the high number of students at the school.
 The recent state-of-the-art Innovation and Design Centre (V Block) - featuring 26 tertiary-style learning spaces, including a broadcast-quality Film and Multimedia Production Studio, and Engineering, Robotics, Design, STEM, Science and Aerospace Labs, outdoor learning spaces, eating areas, amphitheater, lockable power outlets for student's laptop charging, courtyard, and secure undercover bike, scooter and skateboard storage.

Curriculum 
Like all other state high schools in Queensland, ISHS adheres to Australian curriculum standards set by the Australian Curriculum, Assessment and Reporting Authority (ACARA). Senior high school students may graduate with a Queensland Certificate of Education or an International Baccalaureate Diploma. Various VET courses are also offered.

ISHS also offers some Programs of Excellence which are not available under the normal curriculum, including Spanish Immersion, Chinese Acceleration and Maths and Engineering Acceleration.

Culture

Cultural practice is promoted by the school as a central part of the learning environment. The school has many celebrations and festivals throughout the school year, which include art exhibitions, concerts, dance productions, drama productions and a musical. One significant festival that is held every year is United Nations Day, where ISHS encourages its student body to celebrate their cultural or ethnic background, be it through the wearing of traditional national clothing or on stage performances. International food stalls also play a large part in these UN day celebrations. Overall, ISHS has a multicultural community with approximately 43% of the school's population being international students. Some special Assemblies are held at the MPH and all students and teachers must attend. Some include NAIDOC, ANZAC Day, Remembrance Day and most notably Mrs O'Reilley's farewell assembly as she retired after being principal for 20 years.

School Values 
ISHS has four main school values, these values are enforced by the school and try to promote a safe and welcoming learning environment.

 Each person's dignity
 Our community's diversity
 Open communication
 Quality Learning

Notable alumni
Past students who have had very successful careers or have been in the media include:
 Dane Bird-Smith, athlete who represented Australia and won a Bronze medal in the 20 kilometres race walk in the 2016 Summer Olympics.
 Peter C. Doherty, medical researcher, Nobel Laureate 1996, Australian of the Year 1997.
 Peter Greste, Al Jazeera journalist and former Indooroopilly State High school captain.
 George Negus, author, journalist and host of Network Ten's current affairs programme 6PM with George Negus.
 Chloe Shorten, journalist and wife of Bill Shorten.
 Jillian Whiting, Brisbane news reader and television host.

Dress code policy 

In 2020, a petition entitled "Change the Indooroopilly State High School's unfair Student Dress Standard Policy" was posted on Change.org, asking for a review of the Student Dress Policy. The petition argued that the current dress code is sexist and disproportionately affects female students, along with presenting a list of proposed amendments to the policy. It has received more than 600 signatures in support. In response, a review of the dress code policy was scheduled for early 2021.

After the review, the dress code policy was deemed not to be sexist, therefore no further changes were made.

2021 Covid Scare 
During the COVID-19 Pandemic, a student at the school returned a positive test result to COVID-19. As the student had been attending the school for a two day period while infectious, an immediate closure of the school was required. The closure was to last a minimum of two days so a deep clean could be performed. The Queensland Department of Education had initially said they expected the school would re-open after the deep clean was performed, however this turned out to not be the case. The school was made a COVID-19 exposure site. This meant anyone who was at the school while the symptomatic student was in attendance would have to undertake a 14-day isolation period and undertake a COVID-19 Test. As most of the school was in attendance at the same time frame, the majority of the school and staff had to undertake a 14-day isolation period. During the 14-day isolation period the school switched over to online learning and implemented its online learning policy where students interacted with their teachers through Microsoft Teams, OneNote, Word and PowerPoint through their own laptops. Due to the high volume of people needed to be tested, the oval was turned into a temporary drive through COVID-19 Testing site for a short time.

See also

 Queensland State High Schools

References

International Baccalaureate schools in Australia
Public high schools in Brisbane
1954 establishments in Australia
Indooroopilly, Queensland
Educational institutions established in 1954